A vertical market is a market in which vendors offer goods and services specific to an industry, trade, profession, or other group of customers with specialized needs. A horizontal market is a market in which a product or service meets a need of a wide range of buyers across different sectors of an economy.

Types 
There are three types of vertical market which encompass successive market stages of production and distribution: corporate, administered and contractual. 
Corporate vertical markets combine market stages under single ownership.
Administered vertical markets are coordinated by one company due its size and power.
Contractual vertical markets are created by independent companies that combine market stages through legal agreements.

See also 
Vertical integration
Vertical market software
Vertical monopoly
Supply and demand
Product-market fit

References

Market (economics)